Abia is a constituency and community council in the Maseru Municipality located in the Maseru District of Lesotho. The population in 2006 was 17,449.

Villages
The community of Abia includes the villages of Ha 'Nelese, Ha Abia, Ha Bosofo, Ha Joele, Ha Lesia, Ha Mapetla, Ha Matala, Ha Nkhahle, Ha Penapena, Ha Raleboela, Khongoana-Ntšo, Khubelu, Liraoeleng, Makhoakhoeng, Mapeseleng, Masianokeng, Matala Phase I, Shalabeng and Tšieng.

References

External links
 Google map of community villages

Populated places in Maseru District